Neodorcadion orientale is a species of beetle in the family Cerambycidae. It was described by Ludwig Ganglbauer in 1883, originally as a varietas of the species Neodorcadion balcanicum. It is known from Turkey.

Subspecies
 Neodorcadion orientale var. dispar Pic, 1892
 Neodorcadion orientale var. merkli Pic, 1892

References

Dorcadiini
Beetles described in 1883